This is a list of defunct airlines of Lesotho.

See also

 List of airlines of Lesotho
 List of airports in Lesotho

References

Lesotho
Airlines
Airlines, defunct